Fitim Kastrati (born 8 October 1994) is a Norwegian football midfielder who plays for Gefle IF.

He is a younger brother of Flamur Kastrati. He played youth football for Skeid. He made his Norwegian Premier League debut for Vålerenga Fotball in September 2013 against Brann.

Ahead of the 2016 season he joined Norwegian First Division side Bryne. After one season he went on to hometown club Grorud.

In 2018, he transferred to the Swedish club Gefle IF in Superettan.

Career statistics

References

1994 births
Living people
Footballers from Oslo
Norwegian people of Albanian descent
Norwegian footballers
Vålerenga Fotball players
Gefle IF players
Eliteserien players
Superettan players
Hønefoss BK players
Bryne FK players
Norwegian First Division players
Norwegian expatriate footballers
Expatriate footballers in Sweden

Association football midfielders